Lambussie is one of the constituencies represented in the Parliament of Ghana. It elects one Member of Parliament (MP) by the first past the post system of election. Lambussie is located in the Jirapa/Lambussie district  of the Upper West Region of Ghana.

Boundaries
The seat is located within the Jirapa/Lambussie District of the Upper West Region of Ghana.

Members of Parliament

Elections

See also
List of Ghana Parliament constituencies

References

Parliamentary constituencies in the Upper West Region